Acteniopsis kurdistanella is a species of snout moth in the genus Acteniopsis. It was described by Hans Georg Amsel in 1959. It is found in Iraq and Iran.

Subspecies
Acteniopsis kurdistanella kurdistanella (Iraq)
Acteniopsis kurdistanella unicolorella Amsel, 1961 (Iran)

References

Moths described in 1959
Pyralinae
Moths of Asia
Taxa named by Hans Georg Amsel